The Barrow & District League is a rugby league division in and around Barrow-in-Furness.

The league is run by the British Amateur Rugby League Association (BARLA). Officially, teams from the Barrow & District League can apply for election to the National Conference League if they meet minimum criteria. However, in practice the strongest clubs instead enter the North West Counties league, although they are required to enter their reserve team in the Barrow & District League if they do so. Currently the Barrow & District League consists primarily of the reserve teams of such clubs, although Askam and Ulverston have entered their first teams in as of the 2008-09 season.

Teams 2019
The teams currently comprising the league are:

Askam A
Barrow Island A
Dalton 
Millom A
Ulverston A
Walney Central A

See also

 British Amateur Rugby League Association
 British rugby league system
 Cumberland League
 Cumbria Men's League
 Hull & District League
 National Conference League
 North West Counties
 Pennine League

External links 
 BARLA Official Website
 Millom RLFC

Rugby league in Cumbria
Furness
Sport in Barrow-in-Furness
BARLA competitions